is a railway station located in Saku (佐久), Nakagawa, Nakagawa District (Teshio), Hokkaidō, and is operated by the Hokkaido Railway Company.

Lines serviced
Hokkaido Railway Company
Sōya Main Line

Adjacent stations

From 1922, when this part of the Sōya Main Line began operations, until 1977, there was an additional train station between Saku Station and Osashima Station: Kamiji Station.
From 1955 until 1990, there was an additional train station between Saku Station and Teshio-Nakagawa Station: Kotohira Station.

External links
Ekikara Time Table - JR Saku Station

Railway stations in Hokkaido Prefecture
Railway stations in Japan opened in 1922